Mboi (Mboire, Mboyi) is an Adamawa language of Nigeria. Its name is that of one of its dialects, the other two being Banga and Handa. These are rather divergent, Blench (2004) considers them to be distinct languages.

Blench (2019) lists Gana, Banga, and Haanda as language varieties that are part of the Mboi cluster.

References

Roger Blench, 2004. List of Adamawa languages (ms)

Languages of Nigeria
Bambukic languages